The head-twitch response (HTR) is a rapid side-to-side head movement that occurs in mice and rats after the serotonin 5-HT2A receptor is activated. The prefrontal cortex may be the neuroanatomical locus mediating the HTR. Many serotonergic hallucinogens, including lysergic acid diethylamide (LSD), induce the head-twitch response, and so the HTR is used as a behavioral model of hallucinogen effects. However while there is generally a good correlation between compounds that induce head twitch in mice and compounds that are hallucinogenic in humans, it is unclear whether the head twitch response is primarily caused by 5-HT2A receptors, 5-HT2C receptors or both, though recent evidence shows that the HTR is mediated by the 5-HT2A receptor and modulated by the 5-HT2C receptor. Also, the effect can be non-specific, with head twitch responses also produced by some drugs that do not act through 5-HT2 receptors, such as phencyclidine, yohimbine, atropine and cannabinoid receptor antagonists. As well, compounds such as 5-HTP, fenfluramine, 1-Methylpsilocin, Ergometrine, and 3,4-di-methoxyphenethylamine (DMPEA) can also produce head twitch and do stimulate serotonin receptors, but are not hallucinogenic in humans. This means that while the head twitch response can be a useful indicator as to whether a compound is likely to display hallucinogenic activity in humans, the induction of a head twitch response does not necessarily mean that a compound will be hallucinogenic, and caution should be exercised when interpreting such results.

References 

Medical terminology
Lysergic acid diethylamide